was a Japanese musician and record producer from Hitachi, Ibaraki. His younger brother is Hideki Kurosawa, who is also a musician.

Biography
In a contest participating in an amateur band during his school days, a special prize was given from Tetsuya Komuro (later became LR's "(I Wanna) Be With You"). That song began as an opportunity, and later debuted as a composer at the age of nineteen. He provided songs to Yoko Minamino and Nami Shimada.

About 1990, his demonstration tapes (which later became LR's "(I Wanna) Be With You") which he personally made were stopped by ears of record producer Daiji Okai (part of Yonin Bayashi, whom were disbanded at the time) and was acquainted, later introduced to Kenichi Makimura who was a producer of Polystar Records at that time, and had an opportunity debuted to debut as LR.

In 1990, with his brother Hideki and friend Hiruharu Kinoshita, he formed LR and started group activities. In 1991, they debuted with the mini album L, and later released thirteen singles and seven albums.

In 1998, after the end of "Concert Tour '97 'Doubt'," he announced suspension of his activities of LR, and entered solo activities.

In addition to releasing works under his solo name, he also energetically conduct group activities such as curve509, Science Ministry, Ken'z (Ken'z with Friends), Motorworks, and Hanky Panky. While his other activities as music producer and composer were also continuing.

He announced a one-man live holding on his official website on 8 November 2007. In December, he would release a new song for the first time in five years only with iTunes, and would hold a single live at the end of the year, which resumed singer activities.

His tour "Tour without electricity 2008" held at six locations nationwide in May 2008.

On 4 March 2009, he released the album Focus for as a solo for seven years. After that, his band tours were held in six cities nationwide.

On 3 October 2016, on his official website, he publicised that he was under treatment for brain tumour. It was discovered as a result of an inspection after a dizziness occurred during his rehearsal of the live in October 2015, and after that he was repeatedly in and out of hospital.

He later died by brain tumour on 5 December of the same year. He was 48 years old.

On 23 January 2017, at Tokyo Culture Culture the "Flowering Association to remember Kenichi Kurosawa" was held.

Three of his albums first, B and New Voices were reissued on a bonus track on 15 March of the same year. In the bonus track of first, a studio version of "What is this song?" which was unpublished was recorded.

Television appearances
Sunny Rock! (23 Dec 2007, TVK)
Ongaku to Hige (20 May 2008, Niigata TV 21)
Sharam Q Kessei 20 Shūnenkinen Live Kansha! Hatachi no Sharam Q Minna de Oiwaida! Nippon Budokan Festival –Nagai yo– (12 Dec 2008, Wowow)
Tokudane! (5 Mar 2009, CX)
Onegai! Ranking (25 Mar 2010, CX)
1-Ban Song Show (29 May 2013, 22 Jan 2014, NTV)
Kanjani no Shiwake Eight (22 Jun, 6 Jul 2013, EX)
V3 (28 Jun 2013, 27 Feb 2015, KBC)
Arigato'! (1 Jul 2013, 25 Mar 2015, TVK)
1-I o totta Meikyoku Ongaku-sai (4 Oct 2013, NTV)

Discography

Singles

Web singles

Albums

Limited web albums

Main production works
Chiaki Nakajima "Lovely Love Me" (single)
Chiaki Nakajima "Don't Take My Time" (single)
Hidenori Tokuyama "Afureru Omoi" – Also in charge of chorus
Hidenori Tokuyama "One 17th"
Hidenori Tokuyama "Real Time"
hi*limits "Yoizuki"

Main song provisions

Lyrics
Takui Nakajima "Abstract/Kanzen na Sōkan-sei"
Chiaki Nakajima "Don't Take My Time"

Compositions
Yumi Adachi "Kibun Sōkai" (Chisato Moritaka cover)
Junichi Inagaki "Double Meaning"
Mutsumi Inoue "Rendezvous"
Indies "Indies no Theme"
Izumi Kato "7th Heaven"
Nami Shimada "He Loves Her"
chiaki "Canaria"
Masakazu Togo "Hito sukui no"
Hidenori Tokuyama "Drive," "Pure," "Kizuke yo," "Ha-Ha," "Itsumo soba ni," "Love Letter," "Nichijō"
Hiromi Nagasaku "My Home Town," "Without You"
Takayuki Nakamura "Sutekina Paradise," "Asa kara Yoku Hareta Tsuitachi"
Nanatsuboshi "Christmas Calling"
Noriko Hidaka "Nobara Sakukoro," "Doko ka ni Shiawase ga," "Tengoku ni Chikai tokoro de Nakitai"
Yoko Minamino "Side Sheet ni Kotaete," "Sore wa Natsu no Gogo"
Melody "Unmei'95"
Megu "Demo...?"
Chisato Moritaka "Kibun Sōkai"
Shione Yukawa "Kiri no Yoru," "Futari no Tegami," "Cherbourg no Ame"

Songwriting
Kyoko "Baby Queen"
Chiaki Nakajima "Lovery,Love Me," "It Must Be Love," "Peace Of Mind"
Hidenori Tokuyama "Afureru Omoi," "Huckleberry," "Close To Me," "Blue," "Touch Me," "Still Time," "Sotsugyō," "Happy Birthday," "Tsutaeru Kimochi," "Lover’s Kitchen," "For Real," "No,Say Good-Bye," "Throw Away," "Sleepless Night," "With You!," "Life"
Naohito Fujiki "Good Old Summer Days" (*Co-written with Satori Shiraishi)

References

External links
 
Music Shelf interview – Beach Boys and Kenichi Kurosawa 
Kenichi Kurosawa long interview (Tokyo Culture Culture) 

Japanese male singer-songwriters
Japanese singer-songwriters
Japanese male pop singers
Japanese record producers
Shibuya-kei
Musicians from Ibaraki Prefecture
1968 births
2016 deaths